Ute Wild (born 14 June 1965) is a German rower, who competed for the SG Dynamo Potsdam / Sportvereinigung (SV) Dynamo. She won the medals at the international rowing competitions.

References 

East German female rowers
Living people
Olympic medalists in rowing
World Rowing Championships medalists for East Germany
Olympic gold medalists for East Germany
1965 births
Olympic rowers of East Germany
Rowers at the 1988 Summer Olympics
Medalists at the 1988 Summer Olympics